Rodney Winfield (1925-2017) was an American designer and artist based in St. Louis. He designed mostly stained glass as well as silver and brass repoussé, and was notably one of the first to use three dimensions in his stained glass design.

Life and career

Rodney Winfield briefly studied under Carl Ruggles to become a classical musician, before attending the Cooper Union School of Art in New York City under Leo Katz and Stanley William Hayter. Winfield took a position at Emil Frei and Associates after moving to St. Louis in 1953, and was a Professor of Art at Maryville University from 1964 to 1990. In 1970, Winfield moved to Carmel, California, and opened his own studio.

While Winfield designed works almost exclusively for religious institutions, he himself was not religious. Winfield married and had four children, three of whom went on to be artists themselves.

Major works 

Winfield's more well known work was mostly commissions for churches and synagogues, but he also illustrated, painted, sculpted, drew, and made jewelry.

Stained glass 
 Washington National Cathedral in Washington, D.C.
 Basilica of the National Shrine of the Little Flower in San Antonio, T.X.
 The Sheldon in St. Louis, M.O.
 Shaare Zedeek Synagogue in University City, M.O.
 Desloge Chapel, St. Louis University Hospital in St. Louis, M.O.
 Marquette Gallery, St. Louis University in St. Louis, M.O.

The Space Window 

Officially titled the "Scientists and Technicians Window", the stained glass window at Washington National Cathedral in Washington, D.C. contains a basalt moon rock, weighing 7.18 grams.  The window was dedicated by Neil Armstrong, Buzz Aldrin, and Michael Collins. The Space Window contains the only moon rock ever given to a non-government agency.

Silver and brass repoussé and sculpture
 Brotherhood of Man, Grace Cathedral, San Francisco, California
 Rondelle, Christ the King Chapel, Little Rock, Arkansas
 Altarpiece, Temple Israel, St. Louis, Missouri
 Shrine Doors, National Shrine of Our Lady of the Snows, Belleville, Illinois
 Anthropomorpheus Orpheus

Shrine of Our Lady of the Snows 

Winfield designed two sets of bronze double doors for the Shrine's chapel, one to represent the Old Testament of the Bible, and one to represent the New Testament. From the shrine's website: The doors at the right side of the chapel depict the major Old Testament prophets-Moses, Isaiah Jeremiah, and Ezekiel surrounding the tree of Jesse. The New Testament doors, found on the left side of the chapel, depict the Nativity of the Child Jesus. The four Evangelists surround a palm tree that represents Christ's martyrdom. The center section of the doors illustrates the two great Sacraments of the Church (Baptism and the Eucharist). Winfield also designed the bronze crucifix and the black marble altar and tabernacle used in outside liturgies there.

Illustrations
 Short Footsteps on a Long Journey: The Poetry of Chan Sei Ghow (by Chan Sei Ghow, 1967)
 Les Eaux Porteuses: La Decouverte Du Mississippi Par Louis Jolliet et Jacques Marquette (by Anne-Marie de Moret, 1975)
 A Love Without End (by Anne-Marie de Moret, 1976)

References

External links
 Rodney Winfield artworks
 The Brotherhood of Man photo
 Shrine of Our Lady of the Snows doors
 Old Temple Israel altar

1925 births
2017 deaths
American stained glass artists and manufacturers
20th-century American sculptors
Maryville University
21st-century American sculptors
Artists from New York City
Sculptors from New York (state)